Beatrice of Sicily (5 September 1326 – 12 October 1365) was a daughter of Peter II of Sicily and his wife Elisabeth of Carinthia. She was born into the House of Barcelona.

Family
Beatrice was the third of eight children, all of them living to adulthood apart from one sister, Violente. Beatrice's siblings included: Frederick III the Simple, Euphemia, Constance (both regents of Sicily), Eleanor, wife of Peter II of Aragon, Louis of Sicily, and Blanche, Countess of Ampurias.

Beatrice's paternal grandparents were Frederick III of Sicily and Eleanor of Anjou, daughter of Charles II of Naples and Maria of Hungary; maternal grandparents were Otto III of Carinthia and his wife Euphemia of Legnica, daughter of Henry V, Duke of Legnica and Elisabeth of Kalisz.

Life
Beatrice's parents resided in Palermo, where Beatrice was likely born.

In 1335, she was betrothed to John Henry IV of Gorizia, a cousin twice removed of her mother's. Her mother renounced her rights to Tyrol and Carinthia on Beatrice's behalf. However, the betrothal was cancelled by John Henry's mother who decided to settle with the new Habsburg rulers of Carinthia instead.

In 1345, Beatrice married Rupert, Count Palatine of the Rhine from the House of Wittelsbach. They needed a papal dispensation in order to marry. Rupert supported his uncle Prince Elector Rupert I actively with the Government of the Palatinate and was constantly on the move. Beatrice's mother-in-law Irmengard of Oettingen lived as a nun in the convent at Worms. Beatrice spent a lot of time here whilst her husband was away.

Beatrice and Rupert had the following children:
 Anna (1346 – 30 November 1415), married in 1363 to Duke Wilhelm VII of Jülich and Berg
 Friedrich (1347 – c. 1395)
 Johann (1349 – c. 1395)
 Mechthild (born 1350), married to Landgrave Sigost of Leuchtenberg
 Elisabeth (c. 1351 – 1360)
 King Rupert of Germany (1352–1410)
 Adolf (1355 – 1 May 1358)

Beatrice died in 1365, 25 years before her husband became elector. She was buried in the Cistercian monastery of Schönau near Heidelberg. The House of Wittelsbach founded the Collegiate Church in memory for Beatrice.

References

1326 births
1365 deaths
14th-century Italian women
14th-century Sicilian people
House of Aragon
Burials at Schönau Abbey
House of Barcelona (Sicily)
Nobility from Palermo
Daughters of kings